Dilip Sarkar (born 1948 or 1949 - died 9 June 2013) was an Indian politician, who was West Bengal MLA for Barabani.

Death
On 9 June 2013 Sarkar was shot, at the age of 64.

See also
 List of assassinated Indian politicians

References

2013 deaths
1940s births
Members of the West Bengal Legislative Assembly
Assassinated Indian politicians
Indian murder victims
Deaths by firearm in India
Communist Party of India (Marxist) politicians from West Bengal